Labidosa ochrostoma is a species of moth of the family Tortricidae. It is found in the Central African Republic and the Democratic Republic of Congo.

References

Moths described in 1918
Archipini